Kadammanittapally (also known as St. John's Orthodox Church) in Kadammanitta is a parish church under Thumpamon Diocese of the Malankara Orthodox Syrian Church, named after St John the Baptist. Sacred footprints of Geevarghese Mar Gregorios of Parumala are claimed to be in the parish.

Evolution
Prior to the 18th century the Syrian Christians or 'Nasrani', also known as Saint Thomas Christians, had emigrated from various regions of central Travancore to Kadammanitta. These emigrants had worshiped in the neighborhood "Orthodox Valiyapally" church in Kozhencherry. Eventually for rituals like anointing of old and sick (Thailabishekam), Holy Communion (Vishudha Qurbana), and moving the departed for funeral and burial ceremony all the way from Kadammanitta to Kozhencherry became a tribulation for the believers and hence the construction of an Orthodox Syrian church in Kadammanitta was proposed.

In the year 1018 (A.D 1842) the devotees constructed a chapel. Later a smallpox epidemic swept through Kadammanitta; several people fell ill, and two died. After the believers prayed to Saint John the Baptist, the smallpox epidemic ceased. Subsequently, every year the 6th and 7th of 'Makaram' of the Malayalam month was honored as the 'Veliyaperunaal' and as an offertory 'vellayappam' and 'pazham' was given, a practice that still continues.

The prevailing chapel was constructed with straw and palm leaves and the chapel was enveloped with dense forest; people feared forest fires during extreme hot weather. Hence in place of the earth chapel a 'madhbaha' was built at an elevation of 5m, and an 'haikala' and stony wall at a height of 3m from ground.

In the year 1044 (A.D 1868) the government sanctioned a piece of land in the name of a person named Puthenpurackal Chandy Geevarughese, and the present church was erected. This church was solemnized by the metropolitan Joseph Mar Dionysius 5 of the Pulikattil family in A.D.1869.
In the meanwhile, son of Puthenpurackal Chandy, Geevarghese was ordained as the priest for the church. Geevarghese of Kadammanitta was a disciple of Parumala Thirumeni, and he had accompanied Parumala Thirumeni to Jerusalem.

Foundation stone and agreement 
In A.D.1875 the Patriarch of Antioch H.H Ignatius Peter 4 arrived to Kerala. The parish members wished to bring him to visit Kadammanitta. The parish priest Geevarghese was informed about their desire, and made the necessary arrangements for the visit. According to this schedule, in A.D.1875, in the Malayalam month of 'Thulam 16th' (31 October) the Patriarch Bishop had arrived to Kadammanitta, accompanied by Parumala Thirumeni (Chathuruthy Geevarghese Ramban). The bishop was brought to church from 'Pariyaram Mylickal' in a palanquin through a stony and isolated way. The bishop blessed the people and commanded the building of a prominent church there, in place of the existing chapel. The bishop laid the foundation stone in favor of St.Paul & St.Peter (the former church). The footprints of St. Gregorios (Parumala Thirumeni) are believed to bless the St. John's Orthodox Church of Kadammanitta.

The growth and development of the former church advanced over the next 70 years. 21 prominent families signed an agreement in the year 1086, Malayalam month of 'Dhanu' 29th (A.D 1911), declaring that the church and its surrounding shall be independent from Puthepurackal family; the agreement was officially signed by Kulathoor Idiculla in Idicheriya Aranmula sub-registrar office in the year 1911 Malayalam month of 'Dhanu' 30th at 1:00pm. The copy of the agreement which mentions the maintenance of the church and its surroundings was provided to the 21 families.

Construction of the new church- 'KOODHASHA' 
Due to the increasing number of parishioners, the congregation held on the 10 November of A.D.1968 decided to construct a church large enough for all the parish members. However the location of the former church was too small, so more new land was acquired from Chavadyil Mrs.Sosamma George and Mr. Babu and registered in the name of diocese metropolitan Daniel Mar Peelaksinos in 1975, in the time of Fr.P.K.Mathews. Initial construction works of the new church began.
In 1983, during the service period of Fr.Thaiyil.T.M.Samuel, in the month of October, Daniel Mar Peelaksinos laid the foundation stone. In 1985, Fr.Peter Thomas was named parish vicar. By the support and guidance of the vicar Fr.Peter, the parish priest Karingattil Fr.K.C.Jacob, Kizhakeparambil Fr.K.T.Mathukutty (Convener of church construction) and the hard work and effort of the people, the church was built by 1989. On 20 and 21 January, in the presence of the bishop of Malankara Orthodox Church Baselios Marthoma Mathews, the Catholicate Designate (Neeyuktha Bava) Mathew Mar Coorilos, Daniel Mar Philexinos (Thumpamon diocese), Geevarughese Mar Osthanious (Niranam), Philipos Mar Yuosebious (Thumpamon diocese) consecrated the church.

The priest in charge of the parish services 
Puthenpurackal Geevarghese Geevarghese Kathanar was the first priest of St John's Orthodox Parish, and served the church for many years. He was a great follower of Parishudha Parumala Thirumeni as he had visited Jerusalem with this him. In 1990 he had accompanied Parumala Thirumeni to Trivandrum St George Orthodox Church to perform the consecration of the church. Kathanar fell ill and died, and was buried in an English cemetery as it was difficult to bring the body back to Kadammanitta. The funeral service was led by Parishudha Parumala Thirumeni.

From 1900 until 1930 Palumootil Thengumtharayil Geevarughese Cor-Episcopa, Thengumtharayil Fr.T.C. Geevarughese, Mezhuveli Kadavatharayil Veliyachen, Kochachen, had served as the parish vicars. P.C.Geevarughese, son of Puthenpurackal Fr. Geevarughese Geevarughese, was ordained as a priest for the church.
Subsequently, Vayalathala Vadasheriyath Fr.Gaberial, Puthenpeedika Thekkutathil Fr.K.C.Koshy had administrated the works of the parish. After these priests, in 1946 a member of Puthenpurackal family, Karingattil Fr.K.C.Jacob was ordained as a priest for the church.
Until 1971 services in the church were held only every other month, increasing to four times during the dedicated service of Fr.K.C.Oommen. In 1975 Fr. K T mathews, Kizhakeparambil Son of Sri.K.G.Thomas was ordained as the priest.

On 5 August 2012, Fr. P. J Joseph took charge as vicar of the church and Fr. Gabriel Joseph transferred to Mylapra orthodox church. Following the transfer of Fr.P.j. Joseph in 2015, Fr. Sam K Daniel has been appointed as the vicar.

References
 Church's official Website
 Malankara Orthodox Church

Malankara Orthodox Syrian church buildings
Churches in Pathanamthitta district
Churches completed in 1989
20th-century churches in India
20th-century Oriental Orthodox church buildings